Oligoneurina ficicola is a moth of the family Gracillariidae. It is known from South Africa.

The larvae feed on Carissa and Ficus ingens. They probably mine the leaves of their host plant.

References

Endemic moths of South Africa
Gracillariinae
Moths of Africa
Moths described in 1961